Niles North High School, officially Niles Township High School North, is a public four-year high school located in Skokie, Illinois, a North Shore suburb of Chicago, Illinois in the United States. It is part of Niles Township Community High School District 219, which also includes Niles West High School. Its feeder middle schools are Old Orchard Junior High, Oliver McCracken Middle School, East Prairie School, and Golf Middle School. Before being moved to a separate facility in Lincolnwood, Illinois, the school hosted the Bridges Adult Transition program.

Athletics
Niles North competes in the Central Suburban League and Illinois High School Association. Its mascot is the Viking. Niles North's rival is Niles West High School. The crosstown rivalry is referenced as the "Skokie Skirmish."

Activities

The Niles North chess team has won the Illinois High School Association State Championship in 2006, 2010, and 2012.

The Niles North Robotics Team (333) won  the Illinois State Tournament In their 2013-14 inaugural season,. In the 2014–15, all 8 of the Niles North Teams qualified for the Illinois State Competition, with one of the teams, 333M, being crowned the Illinois State Tournament Champions and competing at VEX Worlds. In 2015-16, eight of the nine Niles North teams qualified for the Illinois State Competition. Three teams qualified and competed at the U.S. Robotics Competition; one team was crowned the Illinois State Tournament Champion; one team was crowned the Illinois State Design Award Champions & the Illinois State Robot Skills Champions; three teams competed at VEX Worlds, with one being a Semifinalist in their division.

Notable alumni
Jerry Avenaim (1979), fashion photographer
 Mike Byster (1977), mathematician
 Jonathan Carroll, politician
 Gregg Edelman, Broadway and movie actor
 Nancy Lee Grahn, actress
 Erin Heatherton, model.
 Lynn Holly Johnson, ice skater and actress
 Demetria Kalodimos (1977), anchorperson on TV
 Jonathan Kite, actor
 Mike Krasny, businessperson
 Ronnie Kroell, model and actor.
 Paul Lisnek (1976), attorney, author and TV personality
 Abdel Nader, forward for the Phoenix Suns
 Brent Novoselsky, former NFL player
 Noam Pikelny, banjo player
Eric Rosen, chess master and streamer
 Joel Pollak (1995), journalist  
 Connor Price, actor
 Esther Povitsky,  (2006) comedian and actress.
 Elaine Quijano, broadcast journalist
 Marc Selz (1998), film director and producer.
 Calla Urbanski (1978), Olympic figure skater
 Barrington Wade (2016), NFL player

References

External links
 Official website

Skokie, Illinois
Public high schools in Cook County, Illinois
1964 establishments in Illinois
Educational institutions established in 1964